Hannu Markus Virta (born March 22, 1963, in Turku, Finland) is a retired Finnish professional ice hockey defenceman.  He was named the best defenceman in the Finnish Elite League (SM-liiga) four times, and was a five-time all-star.  He also won the Jarmo Wasama memorial trophy as rookie of the year in 1981–82.

Career 
Virta was drafted in the second round, 38th overall, by the Buffalo Sabres in the 1981 NHL Entry Draft. He played 245 National Hockey League games with the Sabres over five seasons, scoring 25 goals and adding 101 assists.  He also appeared in 17 playoff games with Buffalo, scoring one goal and tallying three assists.

He returned to the SM-liiga in Finland in 1986, where he played for TPS Turku until 1994, as well as in 1996–97.  He helped his team win the league championship three consecutive years beginning in 1988–89.  In 461 league games, he scored 68 goals and 213 assists for 281 points.  He also played in Switzerland, in the Swiss B League with the GCK Lions from 1994 to 1996 and in the Swiss A League with the ZSC Lions in 1997–98.

Internationally, Virta won a bronze medal at the Under-20 World Junior Championships in 1982.  As an adult, he won a bronze medal at the 1994 Winter Olympics playing for Finland's national ice hockey team.  He played at seven IIHF World Championships, winning gold in 1995 and silver in 1994, and leading the tournament in assists in 1996.  He also played in the 1987 Canada Cup and 1996 World Cup of Hockey.

Virta's number 23 was retired by TPS Turku.

Coaching career 
He coached in the SM-liiga with the Espoo Blues from 2003 to 2004, and as of 2008, he coaches for his old team TPS., on 12 January 2009 signs a contract as Head Coach from Hockey Club Lugano.

Career statistics

Regular season and playoffs

International

References

External links 
 
 

1963 births
Living people
Buffalo Sabres draft picks
Buffalo Sabres players
Finnish ice hockey defencemen
Ice hockey players with retired numbers
Ice hockey players at the 1994 Winter Olympics
Medalists at the 1994 Winter Olympics
Olympic bronze medalists for Finland
Olympic ice hockey players of Finland
Olympic medalists in ice hockey
Sportspeople from Turku
HC TPS players
ZSC Lions players